American singer Brandy Norwood entered the music business as a backing vocalist for R&B boy bands such as Immature, prior to launching her own career in 1994. Her discography, as a solo artist, includes seven studio albums, one compilation album, one extended play, 42 singles, 46 album appearances and 25 soundtrack appearances. Norwood has sold over 8.6 million albums in the United States, and more than 40 million records worldwide. Additionally, she has won over 100 awards as a recording artist. In 1999, Billboard ranked Norwood among the top 20 of the Top Pop Artists of the 1990s.

Originally signed to Atlantic Records, Norwood's self-titled debut album, a collection of street-oriented R&B with a hip-hop edge, was released in September 1994, and sold over six million copies worldwide. It produced the three top 10 singles "I Wanna Be Down", "Baby" and "Brokenhearted", of which two reached the top of the Hot R&B/Hip-Hop Songs chart and were certified gold and platinum, respectively. A fourth single released from the album, "Best Friend", became another top 10 hit on the US R&B chart. The following year, Norwood contributed songs to the soundtracks of the films Batman Forever (1995) and Waiting to Exhale (1995), with the single "Sittin' Up in My Room" becoming another top 10 success in the US and first top 30 entry in the United Kingdom. In 1996, she collaborated with Tamia, Chaka Khan and Gladys Knight on the single "Missing You", released from the Set It Off soundtrack, which became her major success in New Zealand, reaching number two.

Norwood's second album Never Say Never was released in 1998 and achieved international chart success, establishing her as one of the most successful of the new breed of R&B female vocalists to emerge during the mid-to late 1990s. It included the number-one singles "The Boy Is Mine", a duet with Monica, and "Have You Ever?". The album was certified five times platinum by the Recording Industry Association of America (RIAA), and sold more than 9 million copies worldwide, becoming Norwood's best-selling album to date. Her third studio album Full Moon was released in 2002 and was certified platinum by the RIAA. It spawned the top 10 hit "What About Us?", alongside two other singles. Norwood's fourth studio album Afrodisiac was released in 2004 and was certified gold. The album failed to achieve success on international music markets.

Following another hiatus and a label shift to Epic Records, her fifth studio album Human was released in December 2008. The album spawned two singles "Right Here (Departed)" and "Long Distance", of which both reached the top of the Billboard Hot Dance Club Play chart. Norwood's sixth album Two Eleven was released in October 2012 and debuted at number three on the US Billboard 200, and number one on the Top R&B/Hip-Hop Albums chart. Its lead single, "Put It Down", featuring Chris Brown and peaked reacher number three of the US Hot R&B/Hip-Hop Songs chart, becoming Norwood's 10th top 10 single on the chart and her first in a decade. A second single, "Wildest Dreams", was released in August 2012. In 2015, Norwood made guest appearances on numerous singles, including "Magic" with Mystery Skulls and "The Girl Is Mine" with 99 Souls. The latter song, a funky house mash-up of  "The Boy Is Mine", marked her highest-charting single in a decade in Australia and the United Kingdom.

On July 31, 2020, Norwood released her seventh studio album, B7, preceded by the lead single "Baby Mama" featuring Chance The Rapper. The official second single, "Borderline", coincided with the album's release. In May 2021, Norwood collaborated with Disney on the single "Starting Now".

Albums

Studio albums

Compilation albums

Extended plays

Singles

As lead artist

Notes

As featured artist

Promotional singles

Notes

Other charted songs

Album appearances

Soundtrack appearances

Notes

A As of July 2012, Never Say Never has sold 4,600,000 copies in the US according to Nielsen SoundScan, with additional 665,000 copies sold at BMG Music Clubs. Nielsen SoundScan does not count albums sold through clubs like the BMG Music Service, which were significantly popular in the 1990s.

See also
Brandy videography
List of songs recorded by Brandy

References

External links
 4everBrandy.com — official website
 
 

Discographies of American artists
Discography
Pop music discographies
Rhythm and blues discographies